Sambo at the 2018 Asian Games was held at the Jakarta Convention Center Assembly Hall, Jakarta, Indonesia from 31 August to 1 September.

Schedule

Medalists

Men

Women

Medal table

Participating nations
A total of 71 athletes from 18 nations competed in sambo at the 2018 Asian Games:

References

External links
Sambo at the 2018 Asian Games
Official Result Book – Sambo

 
2018 Asian Games events
2018
2018 in sambo (martial art)